St Andrew Bobola Church, Hammersmith also known as the Polish Church in Shepherd's Bush is a Roman Catholic parish church serving the Polish community in West London. The building was designed in Gothic Revival style by Edmund Woodthorpe, and stands at 1 Leysfield Road, close to Ravenscourt Park.

History
The church, originally founded in 1869 for the Scottish Presbyterian community, was dedicated to St Andrew the Apostle, patron of Scotland. It was constructed in the then fashionable Neo Gothic style as laid out by architect Edmund Woodthorpe (1814-1887). It was consecrated in 1870. With the passage of time, the congregation declined and in circa 1960 it was decided to amalgamate it with a more active presbyterian parish elsewhere. The church authorities therefore sought to dispose of their asset to another Christian faith community. In 1961 the church was bought by the Polish Catholic Mission to the United Kingdom, with a mortgage, paid off in time with the help of donations and legacies from the faithful.

The church was re-dedicated in 1962, this time to another St Andrew in the Archdiocese of Westminster. Historically, it became only the second Catholic church to serve the capital's Polish community. The first Polish church in London was opened in Devonia Road, Islington, dedicated to Our Lady of Częstochowa and St Casimir. It became the first Polish-owned ecclesiastical building in the British Isles. It was consecrated on 30 October 1930 by cardinal August Hlond, primate of Poland in the presence of Cardinal Bourne of Westminster.

The Bobola congregation in West London was initially made up largely of people who had survived the trials of Siberia during and after World War II. It also served unofficially, as a Garrison Church for the thousands of Polish veterans, who had fought with the allies and were deprived of the right to return to their Polish homeland, surrendered to the USSR under the Yalta Agreement. From 1961 to 1979  Kazimierz Sołowiej (1912–1979) was the parish priest. He took charge of the refurbishment of the building. Despite an "uneventful" exterior, the interior of the church was, according to Bridget Cherry, "daringly modernised" by émigré Polish craftsmen and artists under the direction of designer Aleksander Klecki. It contains many items inspired by Polish art and religious devotions.

To the left of the entrance is the Lady chapel dedicated to Our Lady of Kozielsk, whose original image in Poland was crowned by Pope John Paul II in 1997.

The church is considered a building of architectural heritage. It is listed with the Hammersmith and Fulham Historic Buildings Group. In 2008 the parish priest was presented with a prestigious conservation award for the Church from the Hammersmith Society.

Smolensk Air disaster
The parish and the entire Polish community in West London were shocked and saddened to learn that the fourth parish priest of St Andrew's, Mgr. Bronisław Gostomski had died in the Smolensk air disaster on 10 April 2010. He had been aboard the Polish Airforce Russian-built Tupolev Tu-154 aircraft carrying the delegation of notable Poles intending to visit the Katyn site on the 70th anniversary of the Massacre, when the plane crashed near the Russian city of Smolensk. There were no survivors and the cause of the disaster remains unexplained.

Commemorations 

Because the authorities in Communist Poland would have forbidden any commemorations of Poland's struggle against the USSR, the only way to remember the fallen was to institute such memorials in the then Free World. Hence there are over 80 memorial plaques in the church building. The first to be installed on 24 November 1963 was a plaque designed by Stefan Jan Baran in honour of the Lwow Eaglets ("Orleta lwowskie"). On 12 April 1964 a plaque in honour of  Walerian Czuma was unveiled. Other plaques commemorate the many Polish Army regiments which took part in the defence of Poland in several wars. They include:

On the ceremonial founding anniversary of the Polish Corps of Cadets, on 29 May 1983, memorials to their battalions were unveiled: Cadet Corps Numbers 1, 2 and 3.

On 23 April 1978 soil from the site of the Katyn massacre in Soviet-Russia was brought to the church and secreted inside its wall in commemoration of the 28,000 Polish Army Reserve officers of all faiths and members of the professions, who were murdered in 1940 on the orders of Stalin. The symbolic act was enabled through the offices of Cavalry officer, captain Zygmunt Godyń.

Columbarium
In the small garden of remembrance surrounding the church building is a columbarium, where the ashes of over 1300 deceased are kept. The initiative for a "crypt", to the left of the main entrance came from Maria Leśniak.

Commemorative Gallery

See also 

 Polish Resettlement Act 1947
 Brompton Oratory
 Gunnersbury Cemetery
 Poles in the United Kingdom
 Catholic Church in England and Wales

References

External links
 
 entry on Westminster Archdiocese website

1869 in London
Gothic Revival church buildings in London
1869 establishments in England
19th-century churches in the United Kingdom
Churches completed in 1870
1960 disestablishments in the United Kingdom
Church buildings converted to a different denomination
Former Presbyterian churches
Polish diaspora organizations
Polish emigrants to the United Kingdom
Polish-British culture
Military memorials in London
Polish military memorials and cemeteries
1962 establishments in the United Kingdom
Religious organizations established in 1962
Churches in the Roman Catholic Diocese of Westminster
Roman Catholic churches in the London Borough of Hammersmith and Fulham
20th-century Roman Catholic church buildings in the United Kingdom
Saint Andrew Bobola
History of the London Borough of Hammersmith and Fulham